Henrique Lopes de Mendonça (3 July 1856 – 24 August 1931) was a Portuguese poet, playwright, novelist, novella and short story writer, and naval officer. He wrote several plays, and with his friend, the composer Alfredo Keil, he wrote the lyrics of the future Portuguese national anthem, A Portuguesa, which was officially adopted in 1911.

Family
He married Maria Amélia Bordalo Pinheiro, daughter of famous painter Manuel Bordalo Pinheiro and wife Augusta Maria do Ó de Carvalho Prostes, and had issue, three children: 
 Virgínia Bordalo Pinheiro Lopes de Mendonça (1881–1969), twin, a short story writer and playwright, unmarried and without issue
 Vasco Bordalo Pinheiro Lopes de Mendonça (1881–1963), twin, married to Maria Adelaide dos Santos, and had issue, two children: 
 Manuel Vasco dos Santos Lopes de Mendonça, unmarried and without issue
 Maria da Graça dos Santos Lopes de Mendonça, married on 11 May 1939 to Jorge Maia Ramos Pereira (Caminha, Vila Praia de Âncora, 6 April 1901 – Lisbon, 16 March 1974), an Officer of the Portuguese Navy, without issue
 Alda Bordalo Pinheiro Lopes de Mendonça, unmarried and without issue

1856 births
1939 deaths
People from Lisbon
National anthem writers
Portuguese male poets
19th-century Portuguese poets
19th-century Portuguese dramatists and playwrights
Portuguese male novelists
20th-century Portuguese poets
20th-century Portuguese dramatists and playwrights
Portuguese male dramatists and playwrights
19th-century Portuguese male writers
20th-century Portuguese male writers
19th-century Portuguese novelists
20th-century Portuguese novelists